Peoples Church is a megachurch in Fresno, California, USA with an average weekly attendance of 3,950 people in 2017. The church is led by Pastor Dale Oquist. The church campus includes Fresno Christian High School, a private school attended by students in grades K-12.

History 
Peoples Church was founded in 1954 by several families from the Fresno area. The first pastor, Rev. Floyd Hawkins, led the church from January 1955 to August 1959. He was followed by Rev. Guy A. Davidson who led the church until April 1963. Under his leadership the congregation of about 200 converted old turkey houses into their first church building. 

In 1963, Pastor G. L. Johnson replaced Davidson as head pastor. Under Johnson's leadership, the church grew into a 2000-seat sanctuary in 1977 at the church's current location at Cedar and Herndon avenues. Since moving to the Herndon campus, the church has added two Sunday school buildings, a youth building, a Worship Ministries wing and, most recently, the G.L. Johnson Chapel.

On Sunday, June 3, 2007, Johnson announced during the three morning services his intention to tender his resignation in spring 2008. He said the timeliness of his decision was based upon his 80th birthday and his 45th anniversary as leader of the Peoples Church congregation. Johnson retired in late February 2008, and the pastoral search committee began a nationwide search for a replacement.

In 2010, Rev. Dale Oquist, formerly of Olympia, Washington, was elected Lead Pastor at Peoples Church by an overwhelming majority of voting members..

In 2018, Peoples Church moved the 220 ton G.L. Johnson Chapel in order to make room for future expansion. The expansion plan is expected to cost $20 million and be completed by Easter 2021. The new construction will include a new 45,000 square foot building which will be dedicated for use by the children of the congregation, although the extended lobby will be available for community events .

Creative arts 
Peoples Church is known for its strong use and support of creative arts and technology.

Peoples Church Christmas celebration has been a highlight of holiday events for the Fresno area. Starting in the 1970s, it has grown to a full production including contemporary band and orchestra, choreography, lighting effects and a variety of original and arranged Christmas music.

In June 2014, ChurchProduction.com published an article describing a recent auditorium remodel including the use of LED moving heads from ADJ Lighting, which are mounted on six wire ladders in front of mesh panels. 

In 2016, Peoples Church did a large video upgrade, replacing their old SD cameras and switcher with 3 new 1080p cameras and a new switcher, replacing their old 1024x768 rear projection video screens with new 1080p screens, upgrading their livestream capabilities to HD, and allowing the video feed from the auditorium to be simulcasted to the G.L. Johnson Chapel during their 9:15 AM Classic Gathering.

Peoples Church leadership team 
Lead pastor: Dale Oquist
Chief Financial Officer: Chuck Trogdon 
Chief Operating Officer: Brad Liebe
Worship Arts Pastor: Matt Perkins
Community Connections Pastor: Larry Powell
Assimilation Pastor: Jän van Oosten
Missions and Education Pastor: Terry Townsend
Community Outreach Pastor: Matt Markarian
Women's Ministry Pastor: Joni Oquist
Children's Pastor: Jason Briesacher
Family Counseling Pastor: Barbara Solis
Senior Care Pastor: Camelia Cross

References

External links
Peoples Church
A Quick Review of the Peoples Church of Fresno

Evangelical churches in California
Churches in Fresno, California
Churches in Fresno County, California
Evangelical megachurches in the United States
Megachurches in California